The 1996 Richmond Spiders football team was an American football team that represented the University of Richmond as a member of the Yankee Conference during the 1996 NCAA Division I-AA football season. In its second season under head coach Jim Reid, the team compiled a 2–9 record (1–7 against Yankee Conference opponents) and played its home games at University of Richmond Stadium in Richmond, Virginia.

Schedule

Roster

References

Richmond
Richmond Spiders football seasons
Richmond Spiders football